Snaveolaspis is a genus of mites in the family Parholaspididae.

References

Parholaspididae
Articles created by Qbugbot